Farnborough (Main) railway station is on the South West Main Line and serves the town of Farnborough in Hampshire, England.  The station, and all trains serving it, are operated by South Western Railway.  It is one of three stations in the town; the others, named Farnborough North and North Camp are both situated on the North Downs Line. The station is usually known as Farnborough (Main) in order to distinguish it from Farnborough North, including by National Rail and South Western Railway, although it is often signposted simply as Farnborough.

History

Farnborough railway station was opened in 1838 by the London and South Western Railway (then the London and Southampton Railway), on the line from London to Winchfield (then Shapley Heath). The next year, the line was extended to Basingstoke, then the next year it was connected to Southampton. Throughout its life, Farnborough has been a through station.

In 1849, South Eastern Railway built the North Downs Line, and opened a station also known as Farnborough, but it was not renamed as its existing name Farnborough North until 1923. The main line railway station was often known as Farnborough (Main) and this has become its official name. It is referred to as simply 'Farnborough' on platform and road signs, but National Rail and South Western Railway officially use the suffix (though not on timetables). It was sometimes advertised as 'Farnborough for Aldershot' at an early stage.

As with Hook and Winchfield, there is a wide gap between the tracks. Originally, an island platform stood between them. When the railway was quadrupled, the existing up track became the down fast. The former up platform, an island which had a loop line running behind it was demolished with the loop line becoming the up fast. The new up slow line and a new platform for up services were built at this time (early 1900s).

One source suggests that it may have been used by Queen Victoria to get to Windsor Castle, though the main station she used for Windsor was Slough until Windsor got its own station.

In 2011, the forecourt underwent refurbishment to add two lifts to the platforms plus a new transport interchange complete with taxi rank, three new bus stops and a large bicycle shelter. In 2012, the station booking hall underwent an extensive refurbishment and the booking hall was modernised and enlarged as a result. Furthermore, a double level car park was built in the station during 2014, which has greatly increased car parking capacity at the station.

Accidents and incidents
On 26 November 1947, a passenger train was in a rear-end collision with another due to a signalman's error. Two people were killed.
On 5 April 2016, the "country" side waiting room was targeted by arsonists, causing damage to the interior and attempting to set fire to the ticket office.

Services

South Western Railway operate all services at Farnborough (Main) station. The off-peak service per hour is:
 2 trains each way between Basingstoke and London Waterloo;
 1 train each way between Portsmouth Harbour and London Waterloo.

Facilities
The station has three coffee shops, a waiting room on each platform, a ticket office, self-service ticket machines, smartcard travel facilities and bicycle parking facilities.

Notes

External links

Railway stations in Hampshire
DfT Category C2 stations
Railway stations in Great Britain opened in 1838
Former London and South Western Railway stations
Railway stations served by South Western Railway
Farnborough, Hampshire